David Harold Stern, Ph.D. (born October 31, 1935 - October 8, 2022) was an American-born Messianic Jewish theologian of Israeli residence. He was the third son of Harold Stern and Marion Levi Stern.

Personal life and academic work
Stern's background included surfing, plus a Master of Divinity degree from Fuller Theological Seminary, a graduate course at the University of Judaism (now the American Jewish University), and a Ph.D. in economics from Princeton University. He taught the first course in 'Judaism and Christianity' at Fuller Theological Seminary and at UCLA he was a professor.
 Toward the end of his life, Stern immigrated to Jerusalem, where he remained active in Israel's Messianic Jewish community until his death.

Complete Jewish Bible
Stern's major work is the Complete Jewish Bible, his English translation of the Tanakh and New Testament (which he, like many Messianic Jews, refers to as the "B'rit Hadashah", from the Hebrew term ברית חדשה, often translated "new covenant", used in Jeremiah 31). One unique feature of Stern's translation is the wide usage of transliteration, rather than literal translation, throughout the Bible. For the New Testament, Greek proper nouns are often replaced with transliterated Hebrew words. Stern himself refers to this as a "cosmetic" treatment.

Other notable characteristics of Stern's translation include the translating of Greek phrases about "the law" as having to do with "Torah-legalism" instead. More explanation is found in his Messianic Jewish Manifesto (now out of print) and his Messianic Judaism: A Modern Movement With an Ancient Past (a revision of the Manifesto).

Bibliography

Books
Surfing Guide to Southern California (with Bill Cleary) – 1st ed.: Fitzpatrick 1963. Current ed.: Mountain & Sea 1998, 
Restoring the Jewishness of the Gospel – Jewish New Testament Publications, Jerusalem, 1988, 
Messianic Jewish Manifesto – Jewish New Testament Publications, Jerusalem, 1 May 1988, 
Messianic Judaism: A Modern Movement With An Ancient Past – Jewish New Testament Publications, Jerusalem, April 2007, 
Jewish New Testament : A Translation of the New Testament that Expresses its Jewishness – Jewish New Testament Publications, Jerusalem, and Clarksville MD, September 1989, 
The Jewish New Testament Commentary: A Companion Volume to the Jewish New Testament – Jewish New Testament Publications, Jerusalem, 1992, 
Complete Jewish Bible – Jewish New Testament Publications, Jerusalem, September 1998, 
How Jewish Is Christianity? (with others) (ed by Louis Goldberg) – Zondervan, November 2003,

References

1935 births
2022 deaths
Translators of the Bible into English
Fuller Theological Seminary alumni
American Jewish University alumni
Princeton University alumni
Messianic Jews
University of California, Los Angeles faculty
American people with disabilities
American expatriates in Israel
Israeli Christians